Lost Map is a British independent record label set up in 2013 by Johnny Lynch. The label was established following the dissolution of Fence Records Limited in August 2013.

History
After 10 years of working for and subsequently managing Fence Records, Lynch took the decision to leave the label in August 2013, following his business partner Kenny Anderson's decision to quit the label in April 2013.

With Lynch's departure from Fence, the entire active label roster followed him to his new venture, Lost Map Records, with Rozi Plain, Monoganon, Kid Canaveral, Randolph's Leap, eagleowl, Seamus Fogarty, and The Pictish Trail making up the initial roster of the new imprint.

The first release on the label was made available in the form of a postcard at the Green Man Festival in August 2013, with a digital download code for a seven track compilation of artists on the label. The compilation is also available on the Lost Map website in exchange for subscribing to the email list. The first full release on the label will be the second album by Monoganon, F A M I L Y.

Releases

References

Record labels established in 2013
British independent record labels
Indie rock record labels
Alternative rock record labels
Scottish record labels